Vorobyovo is a rural locality (a village) in Muzyakovsky Selsoviet, Krasnokamsky District, Bashkortostan, Russia. The population was 214 as of 2010. There are 7 streets.

Geography 
Yenaktayevo is located 14 km east of Nikolo-Beryozovka (the district's administrative centre) by road. Neftekamsk is the nearest rural locality.

References 

Rural localities in Krasnokamsky District